Neophyte Phenotype is a 2001 album by Canadian-American alternative hip hop artist Noah23. It features dense wordplay over drum and bass-influenced beats.

Track listing

See also
2001 in hip hop music

References

2001 albums
Noah23 albums